Edule, edible in Latin, may refer to:

 Cerastoderma edule, the common cockle, an edible saltwater clam species
 Cirsium edule, the edible thistle, a thistle species
 Dioon edule, a cycad native to Mexico
 Lemuropisum edule, an edible wild plant native to south west Madagascar
 Memecylon edule, a small evergreen tree native to India
 Mesembryanthemum edule, a synonym for Carpobrotus edulis, the ice plant, highway ice plant, pigface or Hottentot fig, a plant species native to South Africa
 Pangium edule, a tall tree native to the mangrove swamps of Southeast Asia
 Saccharum edule, a plant species belonging of the genus Saccharum, the sugarcane
 Sechium edule, an edible plant species
 Solanum edule, a synonym for Solanum sisymbriifolium, a plant species
 Stylophyllum edule, a synonym for Dudleya edulis, a plant species
 Viburnum edule, a small shrub species native to Canada and the northern parts of the US

See also
 Including use as a species name
List of Latin and Greek words commonly used in systematic names
 Edulis (disambiguation), a Latin word with the same meaning